Flat Classroom Project  is a global collaborative project for students in Grades 3 -12, inspired by Thomas Friedman's book, The World Is Flat, and leverages Web 2.0 tools to foster communication and interaction as well as collaboration and creation between students and teachers from classrooms around the world.

About
Co-founded in 2006 by educators Vicki Davis (U.S.) and Julie Lindsay (Australia), the Flat Classroom® Project is a global collaborative project designed for students, typically in Grades 3 - 12, using Web 2.0 tools to support communication and collaboration between students and teachers from classrooms around the world.  The project was inspired by topics included in Thomas Friedman's international bestselling book The World Is Flat: The World Is Flat: A Brief History of the Twenty-First Century and was featured in the 2007 update "Release 3.0" of that book. The original project served as a foundation which has been recreated and expanded. Currently, the project runs three times a year.

The project has gained international recognition and awards from the International Society of Technology Educators(ISTE), Taking IT Global, World Innovation Summit for Education, and Edublog Awards and has fostered four similar projects based on the same holistic and constructivist educational approach, including the Digiteen, Eracism, NetGenEd, and A Week in the Life projects.

The first spin-off of the NetGenEd Project originally called the Horizon Project, examines the book Growing Up Digital, by Don Tapscott, in conjunction with the New Media Consortium's annual Horizon Report.

Another spin-off effort is the Flat Classroom™ Conference which brings together geographically distant students that may have participated in one of the affiliated projects for a face-to-face meeting. At the conference, students share ideas and take part in theme-based workshops to take back to their home schools. Themes are designed to explore global social issues and inspire unity and action while advancing continued student-to-student and educator-to-educator connections.

Pedagogical approach

The goal of the Flat Classroom Project is to create global collaborative projects and maintain workspaces for students (at all school levels) and educators around the world. The aim is to provide bridging between students, educators, trainee teachers, and post-secondary education institutions.

By "flattening" the walls of the traditional classroom, participating classes essentially become one large virtual classroom, co-taught by participating teachers, via the Internet and a combination of synchronous and asynchronous communication tools.  The project is designed to: 
 develop cultural understanding;
 further skills with Web 2.0 and other software tools;
 provide experience in global collaboration and online learning;
 raise awareness of what it means to live and work in a globalized world;
 encourage research and discussion around the ideas developed in Friedman's core text.

The core pedagogical approach includes the development of two primary products. The first product involves groups of students working collaboratively to compose a wiki web page, based on topic research, and using Wikipedia as a model. The second product involves individual students creating a multimedia artifact, again based on topic research, which should also include a portion requested from another student in a different part of the world. Student work is assessed with common criteria-based rubrics and reviewed by a panel of international judges.

It is designed as a multi-modal, interdisciplinary learning experience that highlights digital citizenship. Additionally, participating students are encouraged to develop Personal Learning Environments and Networks, using a variety of Internet tools, while conducting their research.

Participants
Since 2009, students and teachers from the following schools have participated in the Flat Classroom Project
Academy of Allied Health and Science, Neptune, New Jersey, USA
Anglo-American School of Sofia, Sofia, Bulgaria
Alta Vista School, Los Gatos, CA, USA
Bawlf School, Bawlf, Alberta, Canada
Beijing BISS International School, Beijing, China
The Bullis School, Potomac, Maryland, USA

Canadian International School of Hong Kong, China
Carrabassett Valley, Carrabassett, Maine, USA
Choithram International World School, Indore, India
Citrus High School, Inverness, Florida, USA
Campo Verde High School, Gilbert, Arizona, USA
Don Mills Collegiate Institute, Toronto, Ontario, Canada
Gilbert High School, Gilbert, Arizona, USA
Goodland High School, Goodland, Kansas, USA
Granville College, South West Sydney Institute of Technical and Further Education, Australia
Grup Scolar Agricol Holboca, Sos. Iasi-Ungheni, Romania
Hawkesdale P12 College, Hawkesdale, Victoria, Australia
Highland High School (Gilbert, Arizona), USA
Hopkinton High School, Hopkinton, Massachusetts, USA
The Illawarra Grammar School, Wollongong, New South Wales, Australia
International School of the Americas, San Antonio, Texas, USA
International School of Düsseldorf, Düsseldorf, Germany
Jordan Road School, Somers Point, New Jersey, USA
Korea International School, South Korea
Manitou Springs High School, Manitou Springs, Colorado, USA
Mesquite High School (Gilbert, Arizona), USA
Midpark High School, Middleburg Heights, Ohio, USA
Mount Carmel Area High School, Mount Carmel, Pennsylvania, USA
Nexus International School, Putrajaya, Malaysia
North Rockland High School, Thiells, New York, USA
Osama Bin Zaid School, Oman
Qatar Academy, Doha, State of Qatar
Ravenscroft School, Raleigh, North Carolina, USA
River East Collegiate, Winnipeg, Manitoba, Canada
Rockford Lutheran School, Rockford, Illinois, USA
Royal Masonic School, Rickmansworth, Herts, England
Santa Ana Valley High School, Santa Ana, California, USA
Sotogrande International School, Spain
Spring Woods High School, Houston, Texas, USA
St. Alcuin Montessori School, Dallas, Texas, USA
St. Paul the Apostle, Los Angeles, California, USA
Tok School, Tok, Alaska, USA
Trinity Lutheran School, Joppa, Maryland, USA
Union Intermediate High School, Broken Arrow, Oklahoma, USA
Wakefield School, The Plains, Virginia, USA
Westdale Secondary School, Hamilton, Ontario, Canada
Westside High School (Houston), Texas, USA
Westwood Schools, Camilla, Georgia, USA
Wichern-Schule, Hamburg, Germany
Windsor High School, Windsor, Vermont, USA
Wissahickon High School, Ambler, Pennsylvania, USA

Projects

A Week in the Life.... Project 

With the success of the other projects, it became apparent that many teachers of elementary students were wanting to also take part in the Flat Classroom experience. Beginning in October 2010 through to February 2011 eight international schools joined together to plan, work through and initiate the project.

Schools Involved

 The Phoenix School - Salem, Massachusetts
 International School of Bombay - Mumbai, India
 Yew Chung International School of Beijing - China
 International School of Prague - Czech Republic
 Denton Avenue School - New York
 Falcon School for Girls - London, England
 Yarmouth Elementary School - Yarmouth, Maine
 Mill Creek School - Illinois

Five different categories were chosen for the students to investigate their lives and compare them to other students in the project.  The categories chosen were Food and Celebrations, Clothing, Transportation, School Life, and Housing.  Within each of these categories, teams were created with members from each school participating.  A teacher mentor was in charge of each category to keep the teams focused. Synchronous and asynchronous methods were used to allow for authentic global collaboration among the students. At the end of the project, each team combined their information together into one artifact representing their category sharing their lives from around the world. Teachers as well as students greatly benefited from the collaboration and helped to build relationships that are continuing on.

The pilot project was deemed a success and it has developed into a regular project under the Flat Classroom umbrella.

References

External links 
 Flat Classroom Project website
 Flat Classroom Project wiki
 Flat Classroom Conference website
Digiteen website
Eracism website
NetGenEd website
A Week in the Life website

Educational projects